Rishad Naoroji (born 30 August 1951) is an Indian billionaire, environmentalist, businessperson, author, and one of the members of the Godrej family.

Career 
Naoroji is the cousin of Indian billionaire Adi Godrej and gets his fortune from a one-fifth share in the Godrej family's assets, but has never been involved in the family businesses.

He founded the Raptor Research and Conservation Foundation to focus on the conservation of Indian birds of prey.

Naoroji sits on the governing council of the Bombay Natural History Society.

According to the Forbes Billionaire's List in 2021, Naoroji has an estimated net worth of $2.4 billion, making him the 1299th richest person in the world.

Books

See also 
 Godrej family

References

Indian billionaires
Living people
Indian industrialists
1951 births